

Active museums 
This is a list of museums and non-commercial galleries in Berlin, Germany.

Defunct museums

References

External links 
Museumsportal Berlin
Visit Berlin: Museums + Art

 
Berlin, Germany
Museums
Berlin